Bill Lawrie (25 August 1934 – 24 November 1997) was an Australian racing cyclist. In 1963, he won the Herald Sun Tour. He finished in second place in the Australian National Road Race Championships in 1964.
He rode in the 1967 Tour de France for Team Great Britain and did not start in stage 7. In 1969, he won the British National Road Race Championships.

References

External links

1934 births
1997 deaths
Australian male cyclists
Cyclists from Brisbane